Kundali Bhagya is an Indian Hindi-language romantic drama television series created by Ekta Kapoor. A spin-off series of Kumkum Bhagya, it premiered on 12 July 2017 on Zee TV.

It initially starred Shraddha Arya and Dheeraj Dhoopar as leads, with the latter replaced by Shakti Arora in 2022.

In March 2023, the show took a generation leap and currently stars Paras Kalnawat, Sana Sayyad and Baseer Ali as the second-generation leads.

Plot
Arora sisters Preeta and Srishti leave their hometown Nasik after the death of their father, Raghuveer Arora, who before dying asked his daughters to go to Mumbai and reunite with their mother, Sarla Arora.

Preeta meets the Luthra family and is appointed as a physiotherapist to their matriarch, Bani Luthra, whose younger grandson Karan, a popular cricket star, shares an adversarial relationship with her while the elder grandson Rishabh, a successful business tycoon, shares a rather cordial relationship. Karan and Preeta's alliance slowly blossoms into friendship and they gradually fall in love but don't confess it. On the other hand, Srishti falls in love with Sameer, who is Rishabh and Karan's younger cousin.

Rishabh is soon to marry Sherlyn, who has a secret affair with Preeta's fiancé, Prithvi. Karan and Preeta discover Sherlyn's secret affair. They vow to prevent Sherlyn and Rishabh's marriage but Sherlyn marries Rishabh as Karan and Preeta fail to expose her. Sherlyn lies to Karan that she bribed Preeta with money to not expose her. Mahesh learns Sherlyn's truth but before he could tell anyone, he has an accident because of Sherlyn and Prithvi and is left comatose. Sherlyn lies to the Luthras that Preeta was behind Mahesh's accident and they also start hating Preeta, except Rishabh. Because of the misunderstanding, Karan starts loathing Preeta.

On the day when Preeta was to marry Prithvi, Karan takes his place in the mandap and marries her out of spite. Kareena fixes Karan's marriage with his childhood friend and obsessive one-sided lover, Mahira. However, Preeta remarries Karan by replacing Mahira and returns to the Luthra house. Preeta soon expels Mahira from the house. Mahesh wakes up from coma but has amnesia.

Though Karan and Preeta resolve their differences but their enemies, Sherlyn and Prithvi, create obstacles to separate them. Soon Prithvi tries to manipulate Kritika with mind games to marry her and eventually he succeeds and they marry.

3 months later

Preeta realises that she is pregnant but soon she discovers it was a false pregnancy, saddening her and her family. They then adopt a child, Pihu. It is later revealed that Karan's college friend and one-sided lover, Sonakshi, made Preeta believe that it was not possible for her to conceive and the former gave her pills which unknowingly stopped her from conceiving. Sonakshi hires a goon to create an accident, in which Pihu dies, and the entire Luthra family blame Preeta for it and expel her from the house. Karan expels Sonakshi from his house for coercing him to marry her. Preeta leaves for Bengaluru with her grandmother.

2 years later

Preeta is back in Mumbai and works as a physiotherapist at a clinic. She accidentally meets Mahesh who is delirious and has been confined in a mental institution. She then goes to the Luthra mansion where she learns about what happened in the past two years where Prithvi captured the Luthras' property and business, and that Mahesh suffers from mental illness because of Prithvi. Sherlyn and Prithvi bring a con woman named Natasha in the house to seduce Karan, so that he forgets Preeta but fails.

Preeta reenters the Luthra mansion by presenting Mahesh's will defeating Prithvi's attempt to confiscate the Luthra property and business. She then resolves the family's problems and brings Rishabh back, who was stuck in Dubai due to a case plotted against him by Prithvi and Sherlyn. Rishabh exposes them. Thus, Sherlyn and Rishabh as well as Kritika and Prithvi get divorced. The Luthras overcome their hatred towards Preeta and accept her as their daughter-in-law.

Sherlyn and Natasha convince Karan that Preeta and Rishabh are having an affair. Natasha and her boyfriend Roxy, push a drunk Karan off the dam and he is presumed to be dead. They then go into hiding. Preeta discovers that she is pregnant with Karan's child. The Luthras perform the custom, Chadar Andazi, where Rishabh marries Preeta to give her child a paternal identity.

5 years later

Preeta has given birth to her and Karan's baby, a daughter, Kavya. She and Rishabh have a marriage in name only, moreover share a friendly and respectful relationship. Srishti and Sameer are now married. Sherlyn and Prithvi are also married, but poor.

Karan is revealed to be alive but has suffered a memory loss plus plastic surgery after his accident. He is now known as Arjun Suryavanshi and is engaged to a businesswoman named Nidhi Hinduja who saved him. Later he regains his memory and sets out to destroy Rishabh and Preeta because he believes that they pushed him off the dam. He is accompanied by Nidhi's sister, Anjali.

After some machinations by Anjali, Karan takes over Luthra mansion. He offers to allow the family members stay in the house if Preeta marries him. Preeta gets several clues that Arjun is Karan so she agrees to his terms. Rishabh and Preeta divorce despite the judge declaring their marriage to be invalid, the latter marries Karan, angering Anjali who is obsessed with Karan. The Luthras discover that Arjun is in fact Karan. Karan reveals his mission to destroy Rishabh and Preeta as he believed they pushed him off the dam. Rishabh and Preeta prove themselves innocent by showing him the CCTV footage of the dam on the day of his accident. Thus, Karan and Preeta reunite and Karan severs his ties with Anjali after learning of her misdeeds. The Luthra family have Natasha and Roxy arrested when they learn their truth.

Later, Preeta gives birth to fraternal twin sons, Rudraksh and Shaurya. Karan has Anjali arrested when she tries to kidnap Rudraksh, but soon she escapes from jail and hits them with a truck and kidnaps Rudraksh once again. Karan's face is disfigured and he falls into a coma. Preeta escapes from the accident, however the Luthras blame her for everything and expel her from the house, keeping Kavya and Shaurya with them. Preeta succeeds in saving Rudraksh from Anjali and Anjali falls off a cliff and dies. Srishti then separates from Sameer due to his mistrust of her sister and for how the Luthras mistreated Preeta. Preeta leaves the Luthra Mansion with Rudraksh and Srishti while the Luthras have presumed Rudraksh and Preeta dead.

20 years later

Rudraksh was renamed to Rajveer by Srishti after Preeta lost her memory, and the three of them live in a chawl. Preeta and Rajveer are unaware that they are biological mother and son, and he thinks Srishti is his mother and Preeta is his aunt. Rajveer grows up to be generous and kind-hearted. On the other hand, Shaurya lives with the Luthras and has grown up spoilt and over-pampered and he thinks Nidhi and Rishabh, who are now married, are his parents. Karan is out of coma, he has become a stern businessman, who is mourning the supposed deaths of Preeta and Rudraksh.

Cast

Main
 Shraddha Arya as Dr. Preeta Arora Luthra: Sarla and Raghuveer's second daughter; Pragya, Bulbul and Srishti's sister; Karan's wife; Pihu's adoptive mother; Rishabh's ex-wife; Kavya, Rajveer and Shaurya's mother (2017–present)
 Dheeraj Dhoopar/Shakti Arora/Shakti Anand as Karan Luthra: Rakhi and Mahesh's younger son; Rishabh and Ruchika's brother; Sameer and Kritika's cousin; Preeta's husband; Pihu's adoptive father; Kavya, Rajveer and Shaurya's father (2017–2022)/(2022–2023)/(2023–present)
 Paras Kalnawat as Rajveer (Rudraksh) Luthra: Preeta and Karan's elder son; Pihu's adoptive brother; Kavya's younger brother; Shaurya's twin brother (2023–present)
 Baseer Ali as Shaurya Luthra: Preeta and Karan's younger son; Pihu's adoptive brother; Kavya's younger brother; Rajveer's twin brother (2023–present)
 Sana Sayyad as Dr. Palki Khurana (2023–present)

Recurring
 Vijay Kashyap as Raghuveer Arora: Daljeet's son; Sarla's husband; Pragya, Preeta, Bulbul and Srishti's father; Pihu's adoptive maternal grandfather; Kavya, Rajveer and Shaurya's maternal grandfather (2017) (Dead)
 Supriya Shukla as Sarla Arora: Raghuveer's widow; Pragya, Preeta, Bulbul and Srishti's mother; Pihu's adoptive maternal grandmother; Kavya, Rajveer and Shaurya's maternal grandmother (2017–2022)
 Anjum Fakih as Srishti Arora Luthra: Sarla and Raghuveer's youngest daughter; Pragya, Preeta and Bulbul's younger sister; Sameer's wife; Kavya, Rajveer and Shaurya's aunt (2017–present)
 Abhishek Kapur as Sameer "Sammy" Luthra: Rishabh, Karan, Ruchika and Kritika's cousin; Srishti's husband; Kavya, Rajveer and Shaurya's uncle (2017–present)
 Madhu Raja as Daljeet Arora: Matriarch of the Arora family; Raghuveer's mother; Preeta and Srishti's grandmother; Kavya, Rajveer and Shaurya's great-grand-mother (2017–2023)
 Jasjeet Babbar/Mehnaaz Shroff as Janki: The Aroras' handmaiden (2017–2021)/(2021–2023)
 Manit Joura as Rishabh Luthra: Nidhi's husband; Rakhi and Mahesh's elder son; Karan and Ruchika's brother; Sameer and Kritika's cousin; Sherlyn and Preeta's ex-husband; Kavya, Rajveer and Shaurya’s uncle (2017–2021/2022–present)
Twinkle Vashisht as Kritika Luthra: Kareena's daughter; Rishabh, Karan, Ruchika and Sameer's cousin; Akshay's ex-fiancée; Prithvi's ex-wife; (2017–present)
Mrinal Singh Lal as Ruchika Luthra: Mahesh and Rakhi's daughter; Rishabh and Karan's sister; Sameer and Kritika's cousin; Kavya, Rajveer and Shaurya's aunt (2017)
 Neelam Mehra as Bani Luthra: Matriarch of the Luthra family; Mahesh, Suresh and Kareena's mother; Rishabh, Karan, Kritika, Sameer and Ruchika's paternal grandmother; Kavya, Rajveer and Shaurya's great-grand-mother (2017–present)
 Naveen Saini as Mahesh Luthra: Bani's elder son; Suresh and Kareena's brother; Rakhi's husband; Karan, Rishabh and Ruchika's father; Pihu's adoptive grandfather; Kavya, Rajveer and Shaurya's paternal grandfather (2017–present)
 Anisha Hinduja as Rakhi Luthra: Mahesh's wife; Rishabh, Karan and Ruchika's mother; Pihu's adoptive grandmother; Kavya, Rajveer and Shaurya's paternal grandmother (2017–present)
 Pyumori Mehta Ghosh/Usha Bachani as Kareena Luthra: Bani's daughter; Mahesh and Suresh's sister; Kritika's mother (2017–present)
 Sahil Phull as Deepak: Preeta's former obsessive fiancé (2017)
 Shyn Khurana as Malishka: Karan's former girlfriend (2017)
 Ruhi Chaturvedi as Sherlyn Khurana Malhotra: Sanjana's daughter; Rishabh's ex-wife; Prithvi's wife (2017–2023)
 Sanjana Phadke as Sanjana Khurana: Sherlyn's mother; Kareena's friend (2017–2022)
 Roma Arora as Sofia: Karan's former girlfriend (2017–2018)
 Sanjay Gagnani as Prithvi Malhotra: Pawan's brother; Preeta's ex-fiancé; Kritika's ex-husband; Sherlyn's husband (2017–2023)
 Mahira Sharma as Monisha Sharma: Karan's former fiancée (2018–2019)
 Isha Anand Sharma as Tapsee: Prithvi's former girlfriend (2018)
 Mandeep Bamra as Vicky (2019)
 Ashish Mehrotra/Mukul Harish/Naveen Sharma as Akshay Ahuja: Ruchika's boyfriend; Megha's husband; Kritika's former fiancé (2017)/(2018)/(2021)
 Girish Thapar as Mr. Ahuja: Akshay's father (2017–2018/2021)
 Parveen Kaur as Mrs. Ahuja: Akshay's mother (2017–2018/2021)
 Swati Kapoor as Mahira Khanna: Karan's obsessive one-sided lover and ex-fiancée; Ramona's daughter (2019–2021)
 Kasturi Banerjee/Geetanjali Mishra as Ramona Khanna: Mahira's mother (2019–2020)/(2020–2021)
 Akshay Raj Jawrani as Shiv: Karan's friend; Preeta's one-sided lover (2019)
 Ankit Gupta as Pawan Malhotra: Prithvi's younger brother (2020–2021)
 Saptrishi Ghosh as Suresh Luthra: Bani's younger son; Mahesh and Kareena's brother; Pammi's husband (2021)
 Shravani Goswami as Parminder "Pammi" Luthra: Suresh's wife (2021)
 Priyanka Zemse as Ruchika: Akshay's girlfriend (2021)
 Ruchita Anchor as Megha Ahuja: Akshay's wife (2021)
 Mansi Srivastava as Sonakshi Raichand: Karan's college friend and one-sided lover (2021)
 Hemant Choudhary as Yashvardhan Raichand: Sonakshi's father (2021)
 Giriraj Kabra as Rajat Bedi: Sonakshi's fiancé (2021)
 Trupti Mishra as Dr. Deepali (2021)
 Swarna Pandey as Pihu Luthra: Karan and Preeta's adopted daughter; Kavya, Rajveer and Shaurya's adopted elder sister (2021) (Dead)
 Rishika Nag as Natasha Khurana/Payal: A con-woman and Sherlyn's fake younger cousin sister (2021–2022)/(2023)
 Gaurav Bora as Roxy: Natasha's boyfriend (2022)/(2023)
 Vipin Sharma as Nagre: Prithvi's advocate (2021–2022)
 Ananya Gambhir as Kavya Luthra: Karan and Preeta's daughter; Pihu's adoptive younger sister; Rajveer and Shaurya's elder sister (2022–2023)
 Sonal Vengurlekar as Anjali Hinduja: Karan's obsessive one-sided lover; Nidhi's younger sister (2022–2023)
 Niya Sharma/Ira Sone as Nidhi Hinduja Luthra: Anjali's elder sister; Arjun's widow; Karan's ex-fiancée; Rishabh's wife; Kavya, Rajveer and Shaurya's aunt (2022)/(2023–present)

Guests

Production

Filming
The production and airing of the show was halted indefinitely in late March 2020 due to the COVID-19 pandemic. Due to the outbreak, the filming of television series and films was halted on 19 March 2020 and expected to resume on 1 April 2020 but could not and the series was last broadcast on 24 March 2020 when the remaining episodes were aired. After three months, the production and filming of the series resumed on 29 June 2020 and broadcast to resume from 13 July 2020.

Casting 

In June 2022, actor Dheeraj Dhoopar, who played Karan Luthra, quit the series due to personal reasons and was replaced by Shakti Arora.

In January 2023, a twenty-year generation leap and a new generation of leads were announced. Arora, who replaced Dhoopar as Karan, quit owing to the generation leap, stating he didn't want to play a father to grown-ups and wanted to explore other things. Arora was then replaced by Shakti Anand after the leap. Sanjay Gagnani, who portrayed Prithvi Malhotra, also announced his decisions to quit the series as he wanted to take up new opportunities. Shraddha Arya, who portrays Preeta Luthra, decided to continue as a mother to the new generation. Later in March 2023, Sonal Vengurlekar, playing Anjali Hinduja, also announced her decision to quit after the generation leap because she didn't wanted to age onscreen. Ruhi Chaturvedi, who portrayed Sherlyn Khurana, also quit right before leap as she wanted to explore more as an actress.

Paras Kalnawat, Baseer Ali and Sana Sayyad were introduced as new leads with Kalnawat as one of Preeta's twin sons, Rajveer Luthra, and Ali as Preeta's other twin son, Shaurya Luthra, and Sayyad as Dr. Palki Khurana.

Awards and nominations

References

External links
 Kundali Bhagya at ZEE5
 

Kumkum Bhagya
Balaji Telefilms television series
Zee TV original programming
Hindi-language television shows
Indian drama television series
Indian television soap operas
2017 Indian television series debuts
Television shows set in Delhi
Indian romance television series
Indian television spin-offs